Valentina Nikolayevna Chumicheva (10 August 1931 – 3 January 2021) was a Soviet diver. She competed in the 3m springboard at the 1952 and 1956 Summer Olympics and finished in tenth and fifth place, respectively. She won this event at the 1954 European Aquatics Championships. After marriage, she changed her last name to Dedova. 

After retiring from competitive diving, she became the diving coach at CSKA. Among her students were Vyacheslav Strakhov and Elena Vaytsekhovskaya.

References

External links
 
Profile at Infosport.ru 

1931 births
2021 deaths
Divers from Moscow
Soviet female divers
Olympic divers of the Soviet Union
Divers at the 1952 Summer Olympics
Divers at the 1956 Summer Olympics
Soviet diving coaches